Bandido (English: Bandit) is the seventh studio album by Spanish singer Miguel Bosé (his last with CBS). Bandido was successful in Spain and South America, and you see the new birth of Bosé.

Track listing 

1984 albums
Miguel Bosé albums
CBS Records albums